Siim Kabrits (born 4 July 1979 in Tartu), is an Estonian politician and entrepreneur, and a former member of the Riigikogu.

Kabrits graduated from Tõrva High School in 1997. In 2000 he graduated the Tallinn School of Economics and he got economic law profession. In 2007 he graduated from the University of Tartu Institute of Law with a Bachelor's degree.

From 2007-2012 he was Member of the Supervisory Board of KredEx SA (Credit and Export Agency). Currently he is a member of the Supervisory Board at Gambling Tax Council and at the Environmental Investment Centre

Kabrits is a member of the Pro Patria and Res Publica Union (IRL) from 14 May 1999. He was a council member of the IRL and the IRL's Tallinn city center department chairman.

In 2009 he was a candidate in municipal elections in Tallinn and he became a member of the Tallinn city council (2009-2011).

2011th parliamentary elections he gained 980 votes and became a substitute member of parliament when Helir-Valdor Seeder went to serve as Minister of Agriculture. He was the Chairman of the Riigikogu Mulgimaa Support Group.

References

External links
 Permitgate Investigators Find No Rental Connection to Kabrits ERR News, 1/17/2012

Isamaa politicians
Living people
Politicians from Tartu
1979 births
Members of the Riigikogu, 2011–2015
University of Tartu alumni
21st-century Estonian politicians